Kim Sang-eun (born August 6, 1978), known professionally as Lee Ji-ah, is a South Korean actress. She rose to fame with her role in the television drama The Legend (2007), and has since further participated in Beethoven Virus (2008), Athena: Goddess of War (2010), Me Too, Flower! (2011), Thrice Married Woman (2013), My Mister (2018), and The Penthouse: War in Life (2020–2021).

Early life 
Lee was born as Kim Sang-eun on August 6, 1978, in South Korea. Her grandfather is educator  (His pro Japanese activities during the 1940s are controversial), one of the patrons for the creation Seoul Arts High School, and was chairman of Kyunggi High School. Her father was a businessman. She was in the sixth grade when her family moved to the U.S. and stayed there for 10 years.

She majored in graphic design at the Pasadena Art Center College of Design.

During a brief visit to Korea in 2004, she made her entertainment debut by appearing in an LG Telecom TV commercial with actor Bae Yong-joon. She left the U.S. and returned to Korea in early 2005 and legally changed her name from Kim Sang-eun to Kim Ji-ah and adopted the stage name Lee Ji-ah.

Career

2007–2013
In 2007, Lee made her acting debut in the fantasy television series The Legend opposite Bae Yong-joon. The high-profile, big-budget production shot Lee instantly to stardom. At the year-end MBC Drama Awards, Lee won the Best New Actress award, Popularity award, and Best Couple award (with Bae). She again won Best New Actress for TV at the Baeksang Arts Awards a year later.

She then starred in 2008's Beethoven Virus wherein Lee played a violinist who gets diagnosed with a disease that results in complete hearing loss.

She was next cast in Style, a TV series based on the 2008 chick lit novel of the same title. Inspired by The Devil Wears Prada, Lee played a hardworking assistant to a perfectionist fashion magazine editor played by Kim Hye-soo. She next starred in the Korean-Japanese romance film The Relation of Face, Mind and Love alongside Kang Ji-hwan, which marks her big-screen debut.

In late 2009, she joined the seven-part "Telecinema" series, which brought together Korean stars and directors, and Japanese writers. Each "telecinema" was released in movie theaters and also aired on television on SBS.

Lee then co-starred along Jung Woo-sung, Cha Seung-won and Soo Ae in the 2010 spy series Athena: Goddess of War, a spin-off to 2009's Iris.

In 2011, she starred in the television drama Me Too, Flower!, playing an ill-tempered police officer who falls in love with a young millionaire masquerading as a parking attendant.

When Lee's five-year contract with Bae's agency KeyEast expired on December 31, 2011, she signed with Will Entertainment in March 2012. In 2013, she took on the leading role in Thrice Married Woman.

2014–present

In April 2014, Lee signed with a new management agency, HB Entertainment. This was followed by a three-picture contract with Hollywood indie outfit Maybach Film Productions as a screenwriter.

In 2015, Lee starred in the two-episode fantasy drama Snow Lotus Flower.

In 2016, Lee made her big screen comeback in the action thriller film Musudan. 
In May 2016, Lee left HB Entertainment and signed with new management agency BH Entertainment.

In 2018, after a three-year hiatus, Lee made her return to the small screen in the melodrama My Mister. The same year, she was cast in the horror mystery drama The Ghost Detective.

In 2020, she starred in TV series The Penthouse: War in Life aired on SBS TV from October 26, 2020 to September 10, 2021.

Personal life 
In March 2011, a photo taken by a tourist of Lee and Athena co-star Jung Woo-sung on a date in Paris surfaced on the internet, and the two confirmed that they were romantically involved.

On April 21, 2011, Sports Seoul broke the story (later confirmed by numerous media outlets) that she and Korean pop/rock icon Seo Taiji had been secretly married since 1997, before splitting in 2006. News leaked after two hearings had been held at the Seoul Family Court (court papers used Seo and Lee's birth names - Jeong Hyeon-cheol and Kim Sang-eun, respectively) since Lee filed a  lawsuit against Seo for alimony and division of assets. Both celebrities were believed to have been single.

Lee left for the United States to study in 1993 and met Seo through an acquaintance at a concert in Los Angeles the same year. They developed a long-distance relationship through letters and phone calls while Lee stayed in the U.S. and Seo went back to Korea to continue his entertainment activities with his band Seo Taiji and Boys. In 1996, Seo announced his retirement from show business, after which he went to the U.S. where he and Lee quietly married on October 12, 1997. The couple lived in the States, moving to Atlanta and then Arizona.

They separated when Seo returned to Korea in June 2000 for his comeback to the K-pop scene as a solo artist. Lee, who stayed behind in the U.S., began divorce proceedings in 2006 at the Santa Monica Family Court on the grounds of irreconcilable differences due to incompatible lifestyles and personalities.

Lee claimed in the 2011 lawsuit that she filed for the divorce in 2006 and the court decision became effective in 2009, thus the three years required under Korean law for seeking alimony hadn't expired. But Seo's assertion was that the divorce officially took effect on August 9, 2006, and the statute of limitations had passed. Lee lodged the suit in January and withdrew it on April 30, citing psychological suffering after her private life was made public. Seo's lawyers opposed the motion, and Lee resumed her case, with her lawyer arguing that the California court ruling was invalid and that the two were still legally married. Through mediation, the ex-couple reached an out-of-court settlement in July 2011, which included a non-disclosure agreement.

Filmography

Film

Television series

Television show

Music video appearances

Discography

Singles

Awards and nominations

Listicles

References

External links 
 Official website 
 
 
 

1978 births
South Korean film actresses
South Korean television actresses
Living people
Best New Actress Paeksang Arts Award (television) winners